Alan L. Schiller, M.D. is an American clinical pathologist and an expert in the effects of space and weightlessness on bone structure. Schiller has served on the Space Science Board of the Committee on Space Biology and Medicine of the National Academy of Sciences and as a member of the Life and Microgravity Sciences and Applications Advisory Committee of NASA. He currently serves on the board of directors of the National Space Biomedical Research Institute.

Schiller is the Irene Heinz and John LaPorte Given Professor and Chair Emeritus of the Department of Pathology at The Mount Sinai Medical Center in New York City. He is the author of more than 140 peer-reviewed papers, books, chapters and abstracts, and is listed among New York Magazine's Best Doctors of 2009.

Biography
Schiller earned his A.B. in 1963 from Bowdoin College and his M.D. in 1967 at Chicago Medical School. Postdoctoral internships and residencies between 1967 and 1972 were held at Massachusetts General Hospital and Harvard University.

In 1969, while still a pathology student, Schiller joined the faculty at Tufts University School of Medicine. In 1974, he joined the faculty at Harvard Medical School as an Assistant Professor of Pathology; he was named Associate Professor in 1979. Subsequent appointments include appointments at Massachusetts Institute of Technology and New York University.

In 1988, Schiller joined the faculty at the Mount Sinai School of Medicine as Professor and Chair of the Department of Pathology.

Schiller has served on editorial boards of the Journal of Clinical Orthopedics and Related Research, the Journal of Bone and Joint Surgery, the Bone Research Laboratory, the International Academy of Pathology, Journal of Long-Term Effects of Medical Implants, Modern Pathology, Annals of Diagnostic Pathology Teaching Experience, McGraw-Hill Yearbook of Science and Technology, Encyclopædia Britannica and Skeletal Radiology. Additionally, Schiller serves on the board of directors of the National Space Biomedical Research Institute (NSBRI).

In 2013, Schiller joined the University of Hawaii, John A. Burns School of Medicine as a Professor and Chairman of the Department of Pathology.

Military appointments
Beginning in 1972, Schiller served in the United States Navy Reserve as lieutenant commander. In 1995, he earned the rank of commander, then, in 2002, the rank of captain. Schiller currently serves as specialty leader in charge of all pathology navy reservists. In 2011, he retired from the Navy after 47 years due to a mandatory age requirement.

Awards and honors
1981	Valentina Donahue-Turner Award, for Teaching Excellence, Harvard Medical School
1982	Alpha Omega Alpha, Alumnus Award, Chicago Medical School
1990	Alpha Omega Alpha Visiting Professorship School of Medicine in Shreveport, L.S.U.
1992	Honoree, 25 years, Harvard University, Recognition Award
1999	Honored Guest Professor − 36th Annual Homer H. Stryker Orthopaedic Pathology Conference- University of Michigan Medical Center
2001	Honored Guest Professor – Orthopaedic Pathology & Oncology OITE Review (38th Annual Homer Stryker Orthopaedic Pathology Conference)
2001	Board of Directors, National Space Biomedical Research Institute, NASA
2002–present	American Top Doctors (Outstanding Medical Specialists)
2004	Who's Who Among America's Teachers Selected by the Best Students
2005	Leading Health Professionals of the World (International Biographical Centre), Cambridge, England
2005–present	America's Top Doctors for Cancer

Publications
Partial list:

References

External links

The Mount Sinai Hospital homepage
The Mount Sinai School of Medicine homepage

Living people
Icahn School of Medicine at Mount Sinai faculty
American pathologists
Bowdoin College alumni
United States Navy officers
Harvard Medical School faculty
Rosalind Franklin University of Medicine and Science alumni
Year of birth missing (living people)